Sorgenfreispira exilis is a species of sea snail, a marine gastropod mollusk in the family Mangeliidae.

Description
The length of the shell attains 3.6 mm, its diameter 1.5 mm.

Distribution
This marine species occurs in the Atlantic Ocean from Morocco to Angola

References

 Mariottini, P., Di Giulio, A., Smriglio, C. & Oliverio, M. (2008) Notes on the Bela brachystoma complex, with description of a new species (Mollusca, Gastropoda: Conidae). Aldrovandia 4: 3-20

External links
  Mariottini P., Di Giulio A., Smriglio C. & Oliverio M. (2015). Additional notes on the systematics and new records of East Atlantic species of the genus Sorgenfreispira Moroni, 1979 (Gastropoda Mangeliidae). Biodiversity Journal. 6(1): 431-440
 

exilis
Gastropods described in 2004